Yinon Azulai (born 10 July 1979) is an Israeli politician. He is currently a member of the Knesset for Shas.

Political career
Azulai was sixteenth on the Shas list for the 2015 Knesset elections, but failed to become a Knesset member when Shas won seven seats.

In March 2018, he entered the Knesset as a replacement for his father, Minister of Religious Services David Azulai, who had resigned from the Knesset under the Norwegian Law.

After a minor earthquake occurred in the Haifa June 2018, Azulai claimed that the earthquake came as a result of Reform and Conservative Jews efforts to build a pluralistic prayer area at the Western Wall, including a new area for women. Azulai further stated that Jews who supported such efforts were not actual Jews.

References

External links

1979 births
Living people
Israeli Sephardi Jews
Israeli Orthodox Jews
Israeli people of Moroccan-Jewish descent
Jewish Israeli politicians
Members of the 20th Knesset (2015–2019)
Members of the 21st Knesset (2019)
Members of the 22nd Knesset (2019–2020)
Members of the 23rd Knesset (2020–2021)
Members of the 24th Knesset (2021–2022)
Members of the 25th Knesset (2022–)
People from Acre, Israel
People from Ashdod
Shas politicians